Anobium is a genus of beetles in the family Ptinidae. There are about seven extant and five extinct species in Anobium.

Species
These 10 species belong to the genus Anobium:
 Anobium cymoreki Espaol, 1963 g
 Anobium excavatum Kugelann, 1792 g
 Anobium fulvicorne Sturm, 1837 g
 Anobium hederae Ihssen, 1949 g
 Anobium inexspectatum Lohse, 1954 g
 Anobium nitidum Fabricius, 1792 g
 Anobium punctatum (De Geer, 1774) i c g b (common furniture beetle)

 †Anobium deceptum Scudder, 1878 g
 †Anobium durescens Scudder, 1900 g
 †Anobium lignitum Scudder, 1878 g
 †Anobium ovale Scudder, 1878 g
 †Anobium sucinoemarginatum (Kuska, 1992) g
Data sources: i = ITIS, c = Catalogue of Life, g = GBIF, b = Bugguide.net

References

Further reading

 
 
 
 
 
 
 

Anobiinae
Bostrichiformia genera